Ruby Soho may refer to:
 Ruby Soho (song)
 Ruby Soho (wrestler)